Suhel Debbarma is an Indian politician and executive member of the Tripura Tribal Areas Autonomous District Council (TTAADC).  He is the leader of the Tipra Motha and a former president of youth of the Indigenous People's Front of Tripura (IPFT), Khowai District.

Career 
After graduation Debbarma joined the IPFT in 2019 and became president of youth.

Debbarma also runs a drugs awareness campaign for Tripura youth.

After the 2021 TTAADC Election, Debbarma became executive Member of TTAADC, Tripura from Ramchandra Ghat Constituency. He contested the election from the Tipra Motha political party. He was also a founding member of Tipra Motha.

References 

Year of birth missing (living people)
Living people